The 1918 Keighley by-election was a parliamentary by-election held for the House of Commons constituency of Keighley in the West Riding of Yorkshire on 26 April 1918.

Vacancy
The by-election was caused by the death on 16 March 1918 of the sitting Liberal MP, Sir Swire Smith.

Electoral history
The most recent contest in the constituency had seen a three-way battle;

Candidates
Keighley Liberals chose as their candidate William Somervell, a director of his family business, Somervell Bros. of Kendal, leather merchants and boot manufacturers, later known as K Shoes. Somervell had twice previously contested the South or Kendal Division of Westmorland for the Liberals.

As the by-election was taking place during wartime and Somervell was standing as the candidate of the Coalition government he did not face Conservative or Labour Party opponents. There was however an Independent Labour Party candidate, William Bland, who ran on a "Peace by Negotiation" platform.  He had been the official Labour candidate at the previous contested by-election in the constituency, in 1913.

At one point it looked as if there would be a woman candidate in the field. Nina Boyle, a journalist and well-known campaigner for women's suffrage and women's rights made known her intention to put up at the by-election as a candidate of the Women's Freedom League.  Although women over thirty gained the vote in 1918, there was some doubt as to whether women were eligible to stand as parliamentary candidates. Boyle announced that she would test the law and if her nomination was refused would take the matter to the courts to obtain a definitive ruling. After some legal consideration, the returning officer stated that he was prepared to accept her nomination, thus establishing an important precedent for women candidates. However he ruled her nomination papers invalid on other grounds: one of the signatories to her nomination was not on the electoral roll and another lived outside the constituency. While Boyle did not therefore appear on the ballot paper, she claimed a moral victory for women's suffrage. The Law Lords were asked to consider the matter and concluded that the Great Reform Act 1832 had specifically banned women from standing as parliamentary candidates. The Representation of the People Act passed earlier in the year, did not change that.

Parliament hurriedly passed the Parliament (Qualification of Women) Act 1918 in time to enable women to stand in the 1918 general election. The act ran to only 27 operative words: "A woman shall not be disqualified by sex or marriage for being elected to or sitting or voting as a Member of the Commons House of Parliament."

Result

Somervell was returned easily with a majority of 2,524 votes and well over 50% of the poll. 

Historians have argued that this was an indication of a growing and substantial body of public opinion favouring a negotiated peace settlement with Germany following the publication of the Lansdowne letter and an increasing sign of war-weariness.

Aftermath
Somervell and Bland faced each other again at the General Election 8 months later. However, this time a Unionist also stood and received official endorsement of the Coalition Government, helping him secure victory;

See also
List of United Kingdom by-elections
United Kingdom by-election records
1913 Keighley by-election
1915 Keighley by-election

Notes

References

1918 elections in the United Kingdom
1918 in England
Keighley
By-elections to the Parliament of the United Kingdom in Bradford constituencies
1910s in Yorkshire